Gracjan Jaroch (born 15 April 1998) is a Polish professional footballer who plays as a forward for Skra Częstochowa.

References

External links

1998 births
Living people
Polish footballers
Association football forwards
Warta Poznań players
Pogoń Szczecin players
Miedź Legnica players
Błękitni Stargard players
Bytovia Bytów players
GKS Tychy players
Skra Częstochowa players
Ekstraklasa players
I liga players
II liga players
III liga players
People from Przemyśl